KEBE-FM (95.1 MHz) is a terrestrial American radio station, licensed to Jacksonville, Texas, United States. KEBE-FM is owned by the North Texas Radio Group, L.P..

History
KEBE-FM was initially proposed by Tomlinson-Leis Communications, L.P. through a short form application filed with the Federal Communications Commission and granted on November 17, 2015. The facility is proposed to be constructed on the KEBE tower in Jacksonville, which also provides a transmission site for the KEBE relay FM translator 104.7 K284CT.

KEBE-FM was granted the call sign on September 27, 2018. The call letters were randomly assigned to the AM sister station in 1947, but were later coined by original owner Dudley Waller to stand for "Keeping Every Body Entertained". The KEBE-FM call sign that this facility is now assigned, once belonged to 106.5 KOOI, having been assigned to the facility in 1968, and continuing to utilize them until 1983.

The proposed facility is permitted to operate, once licensed, at an ERP of 200 watts, from an elevation of 86.9 meters height above average terrain. Tomlinson-Leis Communications sold the construction permit for the facility to North Texas Radio Group, L.P. on January 23, 2018.

KEBE-FM filed for a License to Cover the Class A FM facility on October 31, 2018.

On July 16, 2022 KEBE-FM went silent after the tower owner, Chisholm Trail Communications LLC, ceased electrical power at the site, as they prepared to sell the AM facility and tower to North Texas Radio Group. This will result in 1400 KEBE and 95.1 KEBE-FM becoming sister stations once again.

References

External links

EBE